Leptolalax is a genus of frogs (order Anura) in the family Megophryidae. They are sometimes known as Asian toads, metacarpal-tubercled toads, or slender litter frogs, although many species-specific common names do not follow these conventions, and many species do not have common names. They are widely distributed in southeastern and eastern Asia, from southern China and northeastern India to the Malay Peninsula and Borneo. Leptolalax are typically small and have a cryptic colour pattern and no obvious morphological characters useful in systematic studies. Consequently, both molecular genetic analyses and analysis of advertisement calls by male frogs have been important in identifying new species.

Two subgenera are recognized: Leptolalax and Lalos (the latter was first named as Lalax, but the name was already occupied). Lalos has a more northern distribution and only includes species from the continental Asia, whereas Leptolalax includes all the species from Borneo (Leptolalax arayai, Leptolalax dringi, Leptolalax fritinniens, Leptolalax gracilis, Leptolalax hamidi, Leptolalax maurus, Leptolalax sabahmontanus, Leptolalax marmoratus and Leptolalax pictus) as well as few continental species (Leptolalax croceus, Leptolalax melicus) and Leptolalax kajangensis from Tioman Island, at least provisionally.

Most Leptolalax species have been reported from very small areas and only a few species have large areas of occurrence. Whether this distinction is real or the widespread species represent cryptic species complexes remains to be confirmed.

Species
In 2016, 50 species were known in the genus. New species are still being described, including three in 2013, four in 2014, one in 2015, and six in 2016:

References

 
Amphibians of Asia
Amphibian genera